The Balancing Act is a compilation album by indie rock band Cool Hand Luke. It contains songs previously released on the band's albums, EP, and vinyl, plus three new songs.  It was released in 2007 on Floodgate Records.

Track listing
"The Balancing Act" - 5:17
"So Shall It Be" (from Wake Up, O Sleeper) - 4:03
"Wonder Tour" - 3:02
"Cinematic" (from The Fires of Life) - 5:24
"Case of Emergency" (from So Far EP) - 5:42
"10 or 40" (from I Fought Against Myself...) - 6:45
"Sideways" (from I Fought Against Myself...) - 5:43
"A Thank You" (from 7-Inch Vinyl) - 4:44
"This Is Love" (from Wake Up, O Sleeper) - 4:58
"One Time" (from Wake Up, O Sleeper) - 4:51
"I'm Not Ready" (from The Fires of Life) - 5:20
"Skydive" (from The Fires of Life) - 5:23
"Rest for the Weary" (from 7-Inch Vinyl and The Fires of Life) - 6:23
"A Floating Smile" - 3:16

2007 albums